Yukito Tamakuma (born January 25, 1964), better known as Leopard Tamakuma, is a Japanese former professional boxer who competed from 1983 to 1991. He won the WBA flyweight title in 1990.

Professional career

Tamakuma turned professional in 1983 and compiled a record of 17–4 before facing and defeating Lee Yul-woo, to win the WBA flyweight title. He would fight to a draw in his first defense against Jesús Rojas. He later lost the title to Elvis Álvarez. He retired shortly after the fight.

Professional boxing record

See also
List of world flyweight boxing champions
List of Japanese boxing world champions
Boxing in Japan

References

External links

 

1964 births
Living people
Japanese male boxers
People from Aomori (city)
Flyweight boxers
World flyweight boxing champions
World Boxing Association champions